These are the partial results of the athletics competition at the 1997 Mediterranean Games taking place between 15 and 19 June 1997 in Bari, Italy.

Men's results

100 meters
Heats – 16 JuneWind: Heat 1: +0.5 m/s, Heat 2: +1.0 m/s, Heat 3: +0.6 m/s

Final – 16 JuneWind: +0.4 m/s

200 meters

Heats – 17 JuneWind: Heat 1: -0.7 m/s, Heat 2: 0.0 m/s

Final – 17 JuneWind: +1.3 m/s

400 meters
Heats – 16 June

Final – 17 June

800 meters
Heats – 16 June

Final – 17 June

1500 meters
18 June

5000 meters
16 June

10,000 meters
18 June

Marathon
15 June

110 meters hurdles
Heats – 17 JuneWind: Heat 1: -0.9 m/s, Heat 2: -0.6 m/s

Final – 17 JuneWind: +0.7 m/s

400 meters hurdles
Heats – 17 June

Final – 17 June

3000 meters steeplechase
16 June

4 x 100 meters relay
18 June

4 x 400 meters relay
18 June

20 kilometers walk

High jump
18 June

Pole vault
16 June

Long jump
Qualification – 17 June

Final – 18 June

Triple jump
16 June

Shot put
16 June

Discus throw
17 June

Hammer throw
16 June

Javelin throw
16 June

Decathlon
16–17 June

Women's results

100 meters
Heats – 16 JuneWind: Heat 1: +0.3 m/s, Heat 2: +1.9 m/s

Final – 16 JuneWind: +0.4 m/s

200 meters
Heats – 17 JuneWind: Heat 1: -0.2 m/s, Heat 2: +1.2 m/s

Final – 17 JuneWind: -0.9 m/s

400 meters
Heats – ? June

Final – Final – 17 June

800 meters
Heats – ? June

Final – 17 June

1500 meters
18 June

5000 meters
16 June

10,000 meters
18 June

Marathon
15 June

100 meters hurdles
17 JuneWind: +0.3 m/s

400 meters hurdles
17 June

4 x 100 meters relay
18 June

4 x 400 meters relay

10 kilometers walk

High jump
17 June

Long jump
16 June

Triple jump
15 June

Shot put
18 June

Discus throw
16 June

Javelin throw

Heptathlon
15–16 June

References

Partial results (p298)

Mediterranean Games
1997